Yeylaqi-ye Darestan (also Romanized as Yeylāqī-ye Dārestān; also known as Darastan, Dārestān, and Yeylāq-e Darestān) is a village in Rostamabad-e Jonubi Rural District, in the Central District of Rudbar County, Gilan Province, Iran. At the 2006 census, its population was 15, in 9 families.

References 

Populated places in Rudbar County